Michael Riley Mogis (born May 16, 1974) is an American producer/engineer and multi-instrumentalist who, along with his brother A.J. Mogis, founded Presto! Recording Studios (previously known as Dead Space Recording and, earlier, Whoopass Recording). Mogis currently runs ARC (Another Recording Company) in downtown Omaha.

Mogis has engineered, produced, and performed in many of the releases on the Saddle Creek label, including records by Bright Eyes, The Faint, Rilo Kiley, Cursive, The Good Life, Lullaby for the Working Class, Jenny Lewis, Tilly and the Wall and Elizabeth & The Catapult. He is also producing an album for Rachael Yamagata.

He has become a permanent member of Bright Eyes and was also a member of both Lullaby for the Working Class and We'd Rather Be Flying, generally playing guitar, although he also plays mandolin, banjo, pedal steel, glockenspiel, and hammered dulcimer, among other instruments. He worked with Lightspeed Champion (aka Devonte Hynes), former member of Test Icicles, on his debut album Falling Off the Lavender Bridge. He is a member of the supergroup Monsters of Folk.

He has two young daughters, Stella and Riley. Stella appeared on the Bright Eyes album Digital Ash in a Digital Urn.

In 2014, Mike Mogis and Nate Walcott, also of Bright Eyes, composed the soundtrack for The Fault in Our Stars, based on the novel of the same name by John Green.

Album appearances
see also albums by Bright Eyes.

1997
Cursive - Such Blinding Stars for Starving Eyes (1997) - Crank! Records

1998
Bright Eyes - Letting off the Happiness (1998) - Saddle Creek Records

1999
Bright Eyes - Every Day and Every Night (1999) - Saddle Creek Records
Amoree Lovell - The Burning Bush (1999) - Amoree Lovell

2000
The Gloria Record - A Lull In Traffic (2000) - Crank! Records
Bright Eyes - Fevers and Mirrors (2000) - Saddle Creek Records
Cursive - Domestica (2000) - Saddle Creek Records
Melon Galia - Les embarras du quotidien (2000) - Les disques mange-tout
Songs: Ohia - Ghost Tropic (2000) - Secretly Canadian

2001
Cursive - Burst and Bloom (2001) - Saddle Creek Records

2002
The Gloria Record - Start Here (2002) - Arena Rock Recording Co.
Bright Eyes - There Is No Beginning to the Story (2002) - Saddle Creek Records
Bright Eyes - Lifted or The Story is in the Soil, Keep Your Ear to the Ground (2002) - Saddle Creek Records
Cursive - 8 Teeth to Eat You (2002) - Better Looking Records
My Little Cheap Dictaphone - Music Drama (2002) - Soundstation

2003
Azure Ray - Hold On Love (2003) - Saddle Creek Records
Cursive - The Ugly Organ (2003) - Saddle Creek Records
Rilo Kiley - The Execution of All Things (2003) - Saddle Creek Records

2004
Azure Ray - New Resolution (2004) - Saddle Creek Records
Bright Eyes - Lua (Single) (2004) - Saddle Creek Records
Bright Eyes - Take It Easy (Love Nothing) (2004) - Saddle Creek Records
Bright Eyes/Neva Dinova - One Jug of Wine, Two Vessels (2004) - Crank! Records
Broken Spindles - fulfilled/complete (2004) - Saddle Creek Records
Cursive - The Recluse (2004) - Saddle Creek Records
The Elected - Me First (2004) - Sub Pop
The Faint - Wet from Birth (2004) - Saddle Creek Records
The Faint - I Disappear (2004) - Saddle Creek Records
The Good Life - Album of the Year (2004) - Saddle Creek Records
Johnathan Rice - Extended Player 24:26 (2004) - Reprise/WEA
Rilo Kiley - More Adventurous (2004) - Brute/Beaute Records
The Saddest Landscape - Lift Your Burdens High for This is Where We Cross (2004)
Son, Ambulance - Key (2004) - Saddle Creek Records
Statistics - Leave Your Name (2004) - Jade Tree Records

2005
Bright Eyes - I'm Wide Awake, It's Morning (2005) · Saddle Creek Records
Bright Eyes - Digital Ash in a Digital Urn (2005) - Saddle Creek Records
Bright Eyes - Motion Sickness (2005) - Team Love Records
Johnathan Rice - Trouble Is Real (2005) - Reprise/WEA
Johnathan Rice - Kiss Me Goodbye (2005)
Son, Ambulance - Key (2005) - Saddle Creek Records
Maria Taylor - 11:11 (2005) - Saddle Creek Records

2006
The Concretes - The Concretes in Colour (2006) - Astralwerks
Cursive - Happy Hollow (2006) - Saddle Creek Records
Jenny Lewis with the Watson Twins - Rabbit Fur Coat (2006) - Team Love Records
Men, Women & Children - Men, Women & Children (2006) - Reprise/WEA
M. Ward - Post-War (2006) - Merge Records

2007
Bright Eyes - Four Winds (2007) - Saddle Creek
Bright Eyes - Cassadaga (2007) - Saddle Creek

2008
Lightspeed Champion  - Falling Off the Lavender Bridge (2008) - Domino Recording Company
She and Him - Volume One (2008) - Merge Records
Tilly and the Wall - o (2008) - Team Love Records
Rachael Yamagata - Elephants...Teeth Sinking into Heart (2008) - Warner Bros. Records

2009
Alessi's Ark - Notes from the Treehouse (2009) - EMI Records
M. Ward - Hold Time (2009) - Merge Records
Pete Yorn - Back and Fourth (2009) - Columbia Records
Monsters of Folk - Monsters of Folk (2009) - Shangri-La Music
Sea Wolf - White Water, White Bloom (2009) - Dangerbird Records
Julian Casablancas - Phrazes for the Young (2009) - Cult Records via RCA

2010
She and Him - Volume Two (2010) - Merge Records

2011
Bright Eyes - The People's Key (2011) - Saddle Creek
Man Man - Life Fantastic (2011)

2012
First Aid Kit - The Lion's Roar (2012)

2014
First Aid Kit - Stay Gold (2014)

2016
Conor Oberst - Ruminations  (2016) - Nonesuch Records
Joseph - I'm Alone, No You're Not (2016) - ATO Records
Anthony D'Amato - Coldsnap (2016) - New West Records
Ruston Kelly - Halloween (2016) - Razor & Tie/Washington Square
Trashcan Sinatras – Wild Pendulum (2016)

2020
Bright Eyes - Down in the Weeds, Where the World Once Was (2020) - Dead Oceans
Phoebe Bridgers - Punisher (2020) - Dead Oceans

References

External links
Saddle Creek Records

1974 births
Living people
Musicians from Nebraska
Saddle Creek Records artists
People from North Platte, Nebraska
American multi-instrumentalists
Record producers from Nebraska
Bright Eyes (band) members
She & Him members
Monsters of Folk members
Lullaby for the Working Class members